Axiom Films is an international film distributor and producer based in London.

Founded in 1997 by producer Douglas Cummins and partner Rocio Freire-Bernat, Axiom specialises in independent and world cinema, as well as documentary, filmed opera and dance.

Notable films under Axiom ownership include Half Nelson, for which actor Ryan Gosling was nominated for the Best Actor award at the 2007 Academy Awards, In a Better World, which won the Best Foreign Language Film at the 2011 Academy Awards, and the majority of Wim Wenders’s feature and documentary films.

Axiom is owned by UKI Investments and founders Douglas Cummins and Rocio Freire-Bernat, who also retain a controlling interest and act as managing director and director of acquisitions respectively. UKI is one of the largest privately owned investment companies in the United Kingdom, with interests in real estate, mining, agriculture, financial services and technology across a broad geographical footprint. Axiom distributes an average 10 theatrical releases and 20 DVD films each year, as well as online and digitally through LoveFilm, iTunes and FilmFlex.

Films under UK and Irish ownership

References

External links 
 

Film distributors of the United Kingdom